Bennet Evan Miller (born 24 February 1966) is an English actor, comedian, and author. He rose to fame as one half of the comedy duo Armstrong and Miller. Miller is also known for playing the lead role of DI Richard Poole in the first two series of the BBC crime drama Death in Paradise, and for portraying James Lester in the ITV science-fiction series Primeval.

Early life and education
Miller was born in London, England and grew up in Nantwich, Cheshire. The son of an immigrant father, Ben's father Michael Miller was a lecturer in American literature at the City of Birmingham Polytechnic; and his mother Marion was from Wales. His paternal grandfather was a Lithuanian tailor who emigrated to the UK and lived in London's East End. His paternal great-grandmother, Rose Elizabeth Lincoln, taught English at South Cheshire College. He has two younger sisters, Leah and Bronwen.

Miller was educated at Malbank School and Sixth Form College, his local comprehensive school in Nantwich, Cheshire. He read Natural Sciences at St Catharine's College, Cambridge. As an undergraduate, he participated in theatre with Rachel Weisz, and also dated her. He remained at Cambridge to read for a PhD in solid state physics, with his proposed thesis titled Novel quantum effects in low-temperature quasi-zero-dimensional mesoscopic electron systems.

He abandoned completion of his thesis to pursue a career in comedy. Miller's interest in comedy began when a friend asked him to help ferry around the judges of the National Student Drama Festival, which was being held that year in Cambridge. Having already finished his undergraduate degree, he joined the Footlights in 1989, working with Andy Parsons, David Wolstencroft and Sue Perkins, and went on to direct a revue.

Career
Miller moved to London to pursue a career in comedy. He was introduced to fellow Cambridge graduate Alexander Armstrong in 1992, at the TBA Sketch Comedy Group, a comedy club which ran at the Gate Theatre Studio, Notting Hill throughout the 1990s. They performed their first full-length show together at the Edinburgh Fringe in 1994 and returned in 1996, when they were nominated for the Perrier Comedy Award.

Their success resulted in the commission of the television series Armstrong and Miller, which ran for four series from 1997 to 2001 – one on the Paramount Comedy Channel and three on Channel 4. In 1998, the duo also had their own radio show with the same name on BBC Radio 4, which featured many of the sketches and characters from their TV series. After a six-year break, the show was recommissioned for Hat Trick Productions as The Armstrong & Miller Show and three series have been produced. In 2008, they also had a second radio show, Children's Hour with Armstrong and Miller.

Miller also started acting in films, starring in Steve Coogan's first feature film, The Parole Officer (2001). In 2003 he played the role of Bough, sidekick to Rowan Atkinson's title character, in the film Johnny English. In 2004 he co-starred in The Prince and Me.

In 2004 and 2005, he starred in two series of the BBC television series The Worst Week of My Life, with Sarah Alexander. In 2006 he took part in a three-part Christmas special, The Worst Christmas of My Life. He starred as James Peregrine Lester in ITV's 2007 sci-fi drama Primeval and as Mr Jonathan in the Australian film Razzle Dazzle: A Journey into Dance.

Miller provided the voice for the ITV Digital and now PG Tips Monkey in a popular series of television advertisements featuring Johnny Vegas. In 2008, he appeared as television producer Jonathan Pope in Tony Jordan's series Moving Wallpaper on ITV1 and starred in Thank God You're Here. In 2010, he made his directorial debut with the film Huge.

In January 2011 he presented an episode of the BBC science series Horizon titled "What is One Degree?". Later in 2011 he reprised his role as James Lester in the TV series Primeval. From November 2011 he played the role of Louis Harvey in The Ladykillers at the Gielgud Theatre.

On 23 July 2012, Miller began touring for his book, It's Not Rocket Science, from the Royal Society in London. He also appeared at the British Comedy Awards with Armstrong on Channel 4. In 2013, Miller took part in an episode of Room 101 and a Comic Relief special of game show Pointless. On 13 December 2014, he appeared in a Christmas edition of The Celebrity Chase.

From 2011 until the series three premiere in 2014, Miller starred in the BBC-French co-produced series Death in Paradise as Detective Inspector (DI) Richard Poole. A third series of Death in Paradise was commissioned for early 2014. On 9 April 2013 it was announced that Miller would be departing the series, to be replaced by actor Kris Marshall. Filming began in March 2013, and Miller left in May after completion of the first episode, in which his character was murdered. Miller reprised his role for a cameo appearance in a dream sequence during the tenth series in 2021.

Miller explained he had personal reasons for the change. "It was the job of a lifetime, but logistically I just didn't feel I could continue." He went on to say that "My personal circumstances just made it too complicated, but I will miss it like a lung. I love it here." Miller's wife had discovered she was pregnant after he had begun filming the first series. Their time apart caused strains on their relationship, and with his sons. He wanted to spend more time with his family.

In 2014, Miller appeared in the feature film Molly Moon and the Incredible Book of Hypnotism. He also appeared with Billy Connolly and David Tennant in the film What We Did on Our Holiday.

Starring opposite Nancy Carroll and Diana Vickers, Miller played Robert Houston in the play The Duck House by Dan Patterson and Colin Swash. The show is a political satire based on the UK parliamentary expenses scandal.

On 6 September 2014, Miller guest starred in Doctor Who as the Sheriff of Nottingham in the third episode: "Robot of Sherwood".

In 2015, following the 800th anniversary of the Magna Carta, Miller starred as King John in Series 6 of Horrible Histories.

Since October 2015, Miller along with Ruth Jones and Will Close, appears in adverts for British supermarket Tesco as Roger with Jones as his wife Jo and Close as their son Freddie. In 2016, Miller co-presented the ITV entertainment series It's Not Rocket Science alongside Rachel Riley and Romesh Ranganathan.

In February 2016 Miller issued a book, accompanied by a lecture tour, entitled The Aliens are Coming!, examining the question "are we alone in the universe?"

Miller played the role of Murray in the six-part BBC sitcom I Want My Wife Back, starring alongside Caroline Catz. In 2016 he appeared in the Channel 4 comedy Power Monkeys.

In 2018 he returned to the role of 'Bough', sidekick again to Rowan Atkinson's title character, in the film Johnny English Strikes Again. In September of that same year he played the role of Wolf Hall on the BBC sitcom Upstart Crow.

In November 2022, Miller released his seventh children's book Secrets of a Christmas Elf.

Production
Miller directed a television pilot that subsequently became the first episode of Steve Coogan's 2006 British BBC TV series Saxondale. He and Alexander Armstrong have formed a production company named Toff Media.

Awards
Miller was awarded a Judges' Commendation for his portrayal of Hamlet at the 1990 National Student Drama Festival. He co-wrote MindGym, winner of the first BAFTA Interactive Entertainment Award for comedy in 1998, with Tim Wright and Adam Gee. He and Armstrong won a BCA Award  for The Armstrong and Miller Show. In 2010 they also won a BAFTA for The Armstrong and Miller Show.

In 2021, with the cast of Bridgerton, Miller received a nomination for the Screen Actors Guild Award for Outstanding Performance by an Ensemble in a Drama Series.

Personal life
Miller's first wife was Belinda Stewart-Wilson, who guest-starred with him in Series 3 of Primeval. The pair, who have a son born in 2006, divorced in 2011. Miller has another son, born in late 2011, and a daughter, born in June 2015, with his second wife, production executive Jessica Parker, whom he married in September 2013; Jessica is the daughter of British musician Alan Parker.

On 20 February 2009, Miller appeared with Rob Brydon in an episode of QI (Series 6. 9). The two have often been mistaken for each other, and as a joke they dressed in similar shirts for the episode and shared an on-screen kiss.

Miller plays the guitar and drums.

Miller is a very distant relative of US President Abraham Lincoln.

Filmography

Books
 It's Not Rocket Science (2014) Sphere 
 The Aliens Are Coming!: The Exciting and Extraordinary Science Behind Our Search for Life in the Universe (2017) Sphere 
 The Night I Met Father Christmas (2018) Simon and Schuster 
 The Boy Who Made the World Disappear (2019) Simon and Schuster 
 The Day I Fell into a Fairytale (2020) Simon and Schuster 
 How I Became a Dog called Midnight (2021) Simon and Schuster 
 Diary of a Christmas Elf (2021) Simon and Schuster 
 How I Became a Dog Called Midnight (2022) Simon and Schuster 
 The Night We Got Stuck in a Story (2022) Simon and Schuster 
 Secrets of a Christmas Elf (2022) Simon and Schuster

References

External links

 The Armstrong & Miller Show official website
 
 
 Ben Miller hands out his very own BAFTAs

1966 births
Living people
People from Nantwich
Alumni of St Catharine's College, Cambridge
English male comedians
English male film actors
English male television actors
English people of Lithuanian descent
English people of Welsh descent
Male actors from London
20th-century English male actors
21st-century English male actors
English film directors
English television directors
British sketch comedians
Armstrong and Miller